Kermit Maynard (September 20, 1897 – January 16, 1971) was an American actor and stuntman.

Early years 
Born in Vevay, Indiana, he was the son of Mr. and Mrs. William Maynard and a lookalike younger brother of actor Ken Maynard; they were frequently assumed to be identical twins.

Maynard was a 1916 graduate of Columbus High School in Columbus, Indiana. He graduated with a degree in engineering from Indiana University and played college football as a lineman for the Indiana Hoosiers in the early 1920s. While at the university, he lettered in three sports in one year.

After he finished college, Maynard worked as a claims agent for the George H. Hormel Meat Packing Company.

Career 
Often billed as Tex Maynard early in his career, he appeared in 280 films between 1927 and 1962.

In the mid- to late-1930s, Maynard starred in films produced by Ambassador Pictures, a Maurice Conn company that began operations in 1934. He starred in 18 Ambassador films in 1935–1937. After the last of those, Roaring Six Guns, he resumed doing stunt work and acting in supporting roles. 

Maynard also competed as a rider in rodeo competition. In 1933, he won a Pacific Coast trick-riding championship in the Pendleton Round-Up.

Death 
On January 16, 1971, Maynard died at his home in North Hollywood, California, from a heart attack. He was 72 years old. Survivors included his wife and a son.

Selected filmography

References

External links
 
 

1897 births
1971 deaths
Male actors from Indiana
American male film actors
American male television actors
Burials at Valhalla Memorial Park Cemetery
Indiana Hoosiers football players
American stunt performers
Male Western (genre) film actors
20th-century American male actors
People from Vevay, Indiana